The Kerala State Film Award – Special Jury Award is an award presented annually at the Kerala State Film Awards of India.

Winners

See also
 Kerala State Film Award – Special Mention

References

External links
Official website
PRD, Govt. of Kerala: Awardees List

Kerala State Film Awards